I'll Go to the Minister (Hungarian:Felmegyek a miniszterhez) is a 1962 Hungarian comedy film directed by Frigyes Bán and starring László Bánhidi, Antal Páger and János Rajz.

Cast
  László Bánhidi - Parlag Antal 
 Antal Páger - Balogh Bódog 
 János Rajz - Nyóca, elnök 
 Gyula Gózon - Zsüle 
 Gábor Mádi Szabó - Tanácselnök 
 József Horváth - Mester 
 Ádám Szirtes - Miniszter 
 Ferenc Zenthe - Illés Vadász 
 Itala Békés - Juli, Bódog felesége 
 Sándor Tompa - Esperes 
 Antal Farkas - Orbán, Tûzoltóparancsnok 
 Éva Schubert - Dizõz

External links

1962 films
Hungarian comedy films
1960s Hungarian-language films
Films directed by Frigyes Bán
Films set in Budapest
1962 comedy films